Sycamore High School (SHS) is a four-year public high school in Sycamore, Illinois, United States. It is a member of the Illinois High School Association and a part of Sycamore Community Unit School District #427. Sycamore High School is the only high school in the city, and serves students in grades 9–12 living in Sycamore and the surrounding areas.

Athletics

Fall sports
Boys' cross country
Girls' cross country
Dance
Football
Boys' golf
Girls' golf
Boys' soccer
Girls' tennis
Girls' volleyball
Sideline cheerleading

Winter sports
Boys' basketball
Girls' basketball
Boys' Bowling
Girls' bowling
Cheerleading
Dance
Girls' gymnastics
Boys' swimming
Girls' swimming
Wrestling

Spring sports
Baseball
Rugby
Girls' soccer
Softball - 2019 Class 3A State Champions
Boys' track and field
Girls' track and field

Notable alumni
 Bryan Carter - jazz musician
 Mark Johnston - former NFL cornerback
 Lake Kwaza - bobsledder
 Ben Niemann - linebacker for NFL's Kansas City Chiefs.
 Nick Niemann - linebacker for NFL's Los Angeles Chargers.

References

External links
Official website

Public high schools in Illinois
Sycamore, Illinois
Schools in DeKalb County, Illinois